The 1983 Asian Wrestling Championships were held in Tehran, Iran. The event took place from November 8 to November 11, 1983.

Medal table

Team ranking

Medal summary

Men's freestyle

Men's Greco-Roman

References
UWW Database

Asia
W
Asian Wrestling Championships
International wrestling competitions hosted by Iran